Krasin may refer to:

 Krasin (1917 icebreaker),  Imperial Russian icebreaker, launched as the Svyatogor
 Krasin (1976 icebreaker), Russian (formerly Soviet) icebreaker, the second Krasin, launched 1976 
 Krasin Nunataks, a group of nunataks, in the Nye Mountains, Enderby Land, named after the first icebreaker Krasin
 Krasin, Warmian-Masurian Voivodeship, a village in northern Poland
 Krasin (surname)